Telegraph Hill also called "Falmouth Hill" is the highest point in the Town of Falmouth in Barnstable County, Massachusetts. It is located south of West Falmouth. Swifts Hill is located south-southwest of Telegraph Hill.

References

Mountains of Massachusetts
Mountains of Barnstable County, Massachusetts